Curcuma zedoaria (zedoary /ˈzɛdəʊərɪ/, white turmeric, or temu putih) is a perennial herb and member of the genus Curcuma, family Zingiberaceae. The plant is native to South Asia and Southeast Asia but is now naturalized in other places including the US state of Florida. Zedoary was one of the ancient food plants of the Austronesian peoples. They were spread during prehistoric times to the Pacific Islands and Madagascar during the Austronesian expansion (c. 5,000 BP). Its use as a spice in the West today is extremely rare, having been replaced by ginger, and to a lesser extent, yellow turmeric.

Etymology
The name zedoary derives from Persian via Arabic and Latin.

Characteristics
Zedoary grows in tropical and subtropical wet forest regions. The fragrant plant bears yellow flowers with red and green bracts and the underground stem section, a rhizome, is large and tuberous with numerous branches. The leaf shoots of the zedoary are large and can reach 1 meter (3 feet) in height.

Uses

Food
The edible rhizome of zedoary has a white interior and a fragrance reminiscent of mango. However, its flavour is more similar to ginger, except with a very bitter aftertaste. In Indonesia, it is ground to a powder and added to make white curry pastes, whereas in India, it tends to be used fresh or in pickling. In Thai cuisine it is used raw and cut in thin strips in certain Thai salads. It can also be served cut into thin slices together with other herbs and vegetables with certain types of nam phrik (Thai chilli pastes).It is also used in India to flavour dals and chutneys.

Houseplant
The showy C. zedoaria is occasionally used as a houseplant.

In traditional medicine 
The plant is used traditionally to treat inflammation, pain, and a variety of skin ailments including wounds, as well as menstrual irregularities and ulcers.

Others 
The essential oil produced from the dried rhizomes of Curcuma zedoaria is used in perfumery and soap fabrication, as well as an ingredient in bitter tonics. The curcuminoid 1,7-bis(4-hydroxyphenyl)-1,4,6-heptatrien-3-one, and the sesquiterpenes procurcumenol and epiprocurcumenol can be found in C. zedoaria.

See also
 Domesticated plants and animals of Austronesia

References

External links

Curcuma zedoaria information from NPGS/GRIN
CatalogueOfLife.org, Catalogue of Life: 2008 Annual Checklist : Curcuma zedoaria (Christm.) Roscoe
Iptek.net.id, Situs ipteknet 
NIH.go.jp, On curcuma zedoaria 

zedoaria
Edible plants
House plants
Medicinal plants of Asia
Flora of Assam (region)
Flora of Bangladesh
Flora of East Himalaya
Spices